A gradonachalstvo was a special administrative territorial entity of the Russian Empire consisting of a city and its adjacent territory under administration of a gradonachalnik, an official who was subordinated directly to the General Governor and the Ministry of Internal Affairs, instead of a civilian governor.

Gradonachalstvo's were the predecessors of cities of regional significance. The establishment of such municipalities started out in the 19th century.

 Taganrog (1802–1887)
 Odessa (1803–1838, 1856–1920)
 Feodosiya (1804–1829)
 Kerch-Yenikale (1821–1920)
 Izmail (1830–1835)
 Kyakhta (1851–1863)
 Derbent (1860–1863)
 Sevastopol (1872–1920), in 1805–1864 part of Mykolaiv war gubernia
 Saint Petersburg (1873)
 Dalniy (1899–1905)
 Nikolayev (1900–1917), in 1805–1900 as a separate war gubernia
 Rostov-on-Don (1904)
 Moscow (1905)
 Baku (1906)
 Yalta (1914–1917)

The Saint Petersburg and Odessa gradonachalstvo's were forming special land districts as both of the cities dumas were using rights of a country land (zemstvo) assembly and electing deputies to guberniya land assembly.

The city of Dalniy was leased from China by the Russian-Chinese Convention of 1898 for 25 years. It was lost to Japan during the Russo-Japanese War in 1905.

The Moscow Governorate was established in 1709. In 1727 there was established an additional post of a chief commander that existed until 1797 and supervised the governor of Moscow. Simultaneously the Moscow Governorate was also the Moscow General Government. In 1797 the post of a chief commander was transformed into a military governor (since 1816 - a military general governor) and in 1865 into a general governor which existed throughout the empire. In 1905 another additional post was presented for an exclusive administration of the Moscow city, the Moscow gradonachalnik which subordinated to the Moscow General Governor.

References

External links
 Nikolayev Gradonachalstvo. Mykolaiv Oblast: Electronic historical encyclopedia.

Types of administrative division
Local government in the Russian Empire
Russian words and phrases